Jean Guillou (24 June 1931 – 28 August 2019) was a French gymnast. He competed at the 1952 Summer Olympics and the 1956 Summer Olympics.

References

1931 births
2019 deaths
French male artistic gymnasts
Olympic gymnasts of France
Gymnasts at the 1952 Summer Olympics
Gymnasts at the 1956 Summer Olympics
Place of birth missing
20th-century French people